Ladi is a short version of Ladislav, and is a given name on its own. Notable people with the name include:

Ladi Geisler (1927–2011), German musician 
Ladi Kwali ( 1925–1984), Nigerian potter, ceramicist, and educator
Ladi Ladebo (1942–2021), Nigerian filmmaker